"Helpless" is a song written by Canadian singer-songwriter Neil Young, recorded by Crosby, Stills, Nash & Young (CSNY) on their 1970 album Déjà Vu. Young played the song with The Band in the group's final concert with its original lineup, on American Thanksgiving Day 1976 at San Francisco's Winterland Ballroom, with Joni Mitchell providing backing vocals offstage.

Personnel
David Crosby–harmony vocals
Stephen Stills–harmony vocals, guitars, keyboards
Graham Nash–harmony vocals
Neil Young–lead vocals, guitars

References

External links
Transcript of 1995 interview with MOJO magazine

Neil Young songs
1970 songs
Crosby, Stills, Nash & Young songs
Patti Smith songs
Songs about Canada
Songs written by Neil Young